The Norfolk State Spartans refer to the 14 intercollegiate sports teams representing Norfolk State University in Norfolk, Virginia, in intercollegiate athletics, including men and women's basketball, cross country, tennis and track and field; women's sports include bowling, softball, and volleyball; men's-only sports include baseball and football. The Spartans compete in the NCAA Division I Football Championship Subdivision (FCS) and are members of the Mid-Eastern Athletic Conference. Starting with the next NCAA baseball season in 2023, the baseball team competes as an associate member of the Northeast Conference (NEC). The MEAC merged its baseball league into that of the NEC after the 2022 season.

Sports sponsored

Baseball
The Norfolk State Spartans baseball team qualified for the NCAA Division I baseball tournament for the first time in 2021 by winning the 2021 Mid-Eastern Athletic Conference baseball tournament.

National championships

Team

References

External links